The Stateline Wilderness is a wilderness area located in San Bernardino County, California, approximately three miles northwest of Primm, Nevada and I-15.

The limestone/dolomite mountains are steep and rugged. Dominant vegetation includes creosote brush and bursage on the bajadas and Mojave yucca, Joshua tree, cacti, and various mixed shrubs on the slopes. The highest elevations contain some pinyon-juniper habitat. There are no known permanent water sources in the wilderness. Wildlife is typical for the Mojave Desert; including coyote, black-tailed jackrabbits, ground squirrels, kangaroo rats, quail, roadrunners, rattlesnakes, and several species of lizards.

References

External links
Stateline Wilderness - Wilderness Connect
Stateline Wilderness - BLM

Part of this article incorporates text from the Bureau of Land Management, which is in the Public domain.

Protected areas of the Mojave Desert
Protected areas of San Bernardino County, California
Wilderness areas of California
Bureau of Land Management areas in California
1994 establishments in California
Protected areas established in 1994